Howard University College of Dentistry is a school of dentistry located in the United States city of Washington, D.C. It is the only dental school in Washington, D.C..

History 
Howard University College of Dentistry is a part of Howard University. The school was established in 1881 as the fifth oldest dental school in United States. The first African American and longest serving dean (1931-1966) was Russel A. Dixon. He was committed to racial integration and gender equality in dental education. By 1960, more than half of the US's 1,681 African American dentists were graduates of the Howard University College of Dentistry.

Academics 
Howard University College of Dentistry awards following degrees:
Doctor of Dental Surgery
 Certificate in Oral and Maxillofacial Surgery
 Certificate in Orthodontics
 Certificate in Pediatric Dentistry
 Certificate in Advanced Education Program in General Dentistry
 Certificate in General Practice Residency

Departments 
Howard University College of Dentistry includes the following departments:
Department of Restorative Services
Department of Preventive Services
Department of Dental Hygiene
Department of Diagnostic Services
Department of Endodontics
Department of Oral and Maxillofacial Surgery
Department of Pediatric Dentistry
Department of Orthodontics

Accreditation 
Howard University College of Dentistry is currently accredited by American Dental Association.

References

External links
 

Dental schools in Washington, D.C.
Educational institutions established in 1881
Howard University
1881 establishments in Washington, D.C.